Petr Knakal (born 1 February 1983 in Plzeň) is a Czech former football (defender) who played in the Czech First League.

Career
Knakal began playing professional football as a central defender with FC Viktoria Plzeň. He made his Czech First League debut during the 2002–03 season, scoring two league goals for Viktoria. The same year, Knakal played for the Czech Republic at the FIFA Under-20 World Cup finals.

References

External links

1983 births
Living people
Sportspeople from Plzeň
Czech footballers
Czech Republic youth international footballers
Association football defenders
Czech First League players
FC Viktoria Plzeň players
FK Baník Sokolov players
FC Silon Táborsko players
Egri FC players
Czech expatriate footballers
Expatriate footballers in Hungary
Czech expatriate sportspeople in Hungary